Railroad Park is a 19-acre park in Birmingham, Alabama, United States, that opened in the fall of 2010.  It was designed by landscape architect Tom Leader and built by Birmingham-based Brasfield & Gorrie.  The park lies immediately south of the Norfolk Southern and CSX rail lines through downtown Birmingham.  It stretches from 14th Street to 18th Street along First Avenue South.  UAB Hospital and Children's Hospital of Alabama are several blocks south of the park.  The park is a public facility owned by the City of Birmingham and managed by the non-profit Railroad Park Foundation.

In 2016 Rotary Trail was opened, which connects Railroad Park to Sloss Furnaces through a pedestrian greenway.

See also
 Rotary Trail

References 
 Railroad Park, downtown Birmingham's new patch of green, has grand opening - Birmingham News, September 17, 2010
 Hundreds enjoy urban greenery as Birmingham's Railroad Park opens - Birmingham News, September 18, 2010
 So far, so good as people enjoy Birmingham's new park - WBRC Fox 6, October 6, 2010
 Getting on board with greenways - Birmingham Business Journal, October 17, 2010
 Tom Leader Studio website

External links 
 http://www.railroadpark.org

Linear parks
Parks in Birmingham, Alabama
Tourist attractions in Birmingham, Alabama